Zaza Eloshvili (sometimes referred to with the surname Eloev,  ელოევი. (16 October 1964 – 5 January 2001) was a Georgian footballer who played as a defender and made one appearance for the Georgia national team.

Career
Eloshvili played for the Dinamo Tbilisi reserve team, making nine appearances and scoring one goal in 1984, along with three appearances in 1986. He later made fifteen appearances and scored one goal for Kolkheti-1913 Poti in the Umaglesi Liga.

Eloshvili earned his first and only cap for Georgia on 23 February 1994 in a friendly against Israel. He came on as a half-time substitute for Georgi Nemsadze, with the away match in Ashdod finishing as a 0–2 loss for Georgia.

His career was halted due to injuries.

Personal life

Zaza Eloshvili has a mother - Tania Kulumbegashvili, a father - Shalva Eloshvili (passed away in 2006) a sister - Maia Eloshvili, a brother-in-law - Vakhtang Talakhadze and a nephew - Tevdore Talakhadze.

Career statistics

International

References

External links
 FootballFacts.ru profile 1
 FootballFacts.ru profile 2
 FootballFacts.ru profile 3
 FootBook.ru profile 1 
 FootBook.ru profile 2 

1964 births
2001 deaths
Footballers from Tbilisi
Footballers from Georgia (country)
Ossetian footballers
Georgian people of Ossetian descent
Georgia (country) international footballers
Association football defenders
FC Lokomotivi Tbilisi players
FC Dinamo Tbilisi players
FC Kolkheti-1913 Poti players
FC Duruji Kvareli players
Soviet Second League players
Erovnuli Liga players